Mark McLeod may refer to:
 Mark McLeod (Australian footballer), Australian rules footballer
 Mark McLeod (English footballer), English football midfielder